Polygon Bikes is a bicycle's trade name made by PT Insera Sena, an Indonesian bicycle manufacturer based in Sidoarjo, East Java. Polygon operates manufacturing facilities in various places in Indonesia. Polygon has a globally connected design team, and commonly used as sponsor and its bike in bicycle competition.

History

Polygon Bikes began building bicycles in 1989 for the Southeast Asian markets. They started manufacturing bicycles with steel and aluminium frames. In 1997, Polygon launched a concept store, Rodalink (Roda Lintas Khatulistiwa), which sells Polygon bikes, parts and accessories. In 2007, Polygon expanded its distribution in Australia. Polygon Bikes expanded to Europe in 2011, settling their headquarters of Europe in Germany. In April 2014, Polygon Bikes expanded again in America.

Models

Polygon manufactures a broad range of bicycles that includes Mountain bikes, Road bikes, Urban bikes, E-bikes, BMX bikes and Youth bikes.

Mountain Bikes
Polygon produces mountain bikes for several categories of use.

Mountain Bike Types: Downhill, Freeride, All Mountain, Trail, Cross-country (XC), Leisure, Women's.

Road Bikes
Polygon road bikes are manufactured in both state-of-the-art composite alloy and carbon frames.

Road Bike Types: Racing, Endurance, Cyclocross, Flat bar road bike.

Urban Bikes
Polygon Urban models feature aluminum construction.

Urban Bikes Types: Hybrid, Utility, City, Tandem, Folding bike.

BMX bikes
BMX/ Dirt Jump bikes types: BMX Race, BMX Freestyle, Dirt Jump.

Youth Bike
Youth Bike Types: Youth Road, Youth Mountain 24", Youth Mountain 20".

Sponsorship
Polygon works with their sponsored athletes in the development process to help them test and provide feedback on designs.

Polygon supports the following Athletes:

Enduro: Dan Wolfe

References

External links

 Official Insera website
 Official Polygon website
 Official Store of Rodalink

Cycle manufacturers of Indonesia
Vehicle manufacturing companies established in 1989
Mountain bike manufacturers
Companies based in Sidoarjo
Indonesian brands